Jake DeBrusk (born October 17, 1996) is a Canadian professional ice hockey left winger currently playing for the Boston Bruins in the National Hockey League (NHL) where he wears jersey number 74. He was drafted 14th overall by the Bruins in the 2015 NHL Entry Draft. DeBrusk is the son of colour commentator and former NHL forward Louie DeBrusk.

Playing career

Amateur 
DeBrusk was taken in the 7th round by the Swift Current Broncos at the 2011 WHL Bantam Draft. In 2015, he was selected for the CHL/NHL Top Prospects Game. DeBrusk scored 81 points in 72 games with the Swift Current Broncos during the 2014–15 WHL season. On December 26, 2015, the Broncos traded DeBrusk to the Red Deer Rebels. DeBrusk went to the 2016 Memorial Cup with the host Rebels, where they were eliminated by the Rouyn-Noranda Huskies in the semi-final match.

Professional
Ranked number 19 on the NHL Central Scouting Bureau's list of North American skaters eligible for the 2015 NHL Entry Draft, DeBrusk was selected in the first round, 14th overall, by the Boston Bruins. On November 12, 2015, while playing with Red Deer during the 2015–16 Western Hockey League season, DeBrusk signed a three-year entry-level contract with Boston and was assigned to the Providence Bruins for the 2016–17 season.

DeBrusk played 74 games with the Providence Bruins in which he totalled 49 points. 

DeBrusk's first-ever NHL goal occurred as the Bruins opened their 2017–18 regular season against the Nashville Predators on October 5, 2017. His goal was the second of four goals the Bruins scored in a 4–3 home-ice win over Nashville, with his father Louie DeBrusk and family in the stands at TD Garden to witness the event. He also assisted on another Bruins goal in the game, joining fellow Bruins rookie defenseman Charlie McAvoy in garnering two points each, in each skater's first regular-season NHL game.

By the end of his rookie season with the Bruins, DeBrusk scored 43 points and regularly played on the second line.

On November 23, 2020, DeBrusk signed a two-year, $7.35 million contract with the Bruins, with an annual cap hit of $3.675 million.

On November 29, 2021, DeBrusk requested a trade from the Bruins.

On February 28, 2022, DeBrusk scored a natural hat trick, scoring the first three goals in a 7–0 victory over the Los Angeles Kings. Amidst a hot scoring streak, and playing with Bruins stars Patrice Bergeron and Brad Marchand, questions were raised whether DeBrusk had a change of heart about his trade request earlier in the season. However, DeBrusk's agent later reiterated that DeBrusk still wanted to be traded.

On March 21, 2022, the day of the 2022 NHL Trade deadline, DeBrusk signed a two-year, $8 million extension with the Bruins. It was speculated the signing was meant to more easily facilitate a trade from Boston, as there had been no indication his earlier trade request had been rescinded; however the deadline passed without Debrusk being moved. 

On July 5, 2022, it was reported that DeBrusk rescinded his trade request. The report came shortly after the Bruins fired head coach Bruce Cassidy, leading to questions whether Cassidy was the factor in DeBrusk's trade request and the later rescinding of it. DeBrusk neither confirmed or denied these rumors when asked about it later in the offseason during a captain's practice.

Personal life
DeBrusk is the son of former NHL player and current Hockey Night in Canada broadcaster Louie DeBrusk, who played 401 NHL games for the Edmonton Oilers, Tampa Bay Lightning, Phoenix Coyotes, and Chicago Blackhawks.

Career statistics

Awards and honours

References

External links

1996 births
Living people
Boston Bruins draft picks
Boston Bruins players
Canadian ice hockey left wingers
National Hockey League first-round draft picks
Providence Bruins players
Red Deer Rebels players
Ice hockey people from Edmonton
Swift Current Broncos players